Muhammad Rafique is a Pakistani politician who was a Member of the Provincial Assembly of the Punjab, from 1985 to 1988 and again from 2008 to May 2018.

Early life and education
He was born on 10 December 1941 in Toba Tek Singh.

He graduated from Government College University in 1963 and has the degree of Bachelor of Arts.

Political career
He was elected to the Provincial Assembly of the Punjab from Constituency PP-89 (Toba Tek Singh) in 1985 Pakistani general election.

He ran for the seat of the Provincial Assembly of the Punjab as a candidate of Pakistan Peoples Party from Constituency PP-90 (Toba Tek Singh-VII) in 2002 Pakistani general election, but was unsuccessful. He received 22,751 votes and lost the seat to an independent candidate, Liaquat Ali Shoukat.

He was re-elected to the Provincial Assembly of the Punjab as a candidate of Pakistan Muslim League (N) (PML-N) from Constituency PP-90 (Toba Tek Singh-VII) in 2008 Pakistani general election. He received 39,539 votes and defeated a candidate of Pakistan Muslim League (Q).

He was re-elected to the Provincial Assembly of the Punjab as a candidate of PML-N from Constituency PP-90 (Toba Tek Singh-VII) in 2013 Pakistani general election.

References

Living people
Punjab MPAs 2013–2018
Punjab MPAs 2008–2013
1941 births
Pakistan Muslim League (N) politicians
Punjab MPAs 1985–1988